Cummington is a town in Hampshire County, Massachusetts, United States. The population was 829 at the 2020 census, down from 872 at the 2010 census. It is part of the Springfield, Massachusetts Metropolitan Statistical Area.

History 
Cummington was first settled in 1762 and was officially incorporated in 1779. It was named after Colonel John Cumings, the original landholder.

The first Congregational Church minister was Rev. James Briggs (1743–1825) of Norton, Massachusetts, and a graduate of Yale College around 1775. Briggs was the son of Deacon James and Damaris (White) Briggs, and the husband of Anna Wiswall.

Although a small town, several Revolutionary War patriots are buried there, including Nathaniel Holbrook, Seth Wilder Sr., and Seth Wilder Jr.

Noted poet and newspaper editor William Cullen Bryant was born in Cummington, and returned for many years to summer in the town. His house is now preserved and open to the public as the William Cullen Bryant Homestead. The town hosts the Cummington Fair every August on the town's fairgrounds. The fair features many events, including adult and 4-H exhibition halls, a craft barn, vaudeville stage, antique car parade, oxen pull, and an assortment of fair rides, games, and food stands.

The town was the subject of a 1945 documentary film, The Cummington Story, about the welcome given to a group of European refugees.

Geography
Cummington is in northwestern Hampshire County. It is bordered to the west by the towns of Peru and Windsor in Berkshire County, to the north by Plainfield in Hampshire County, and to the northeast by Ashfield in Franklin County. To the east is the town of Goshen, to the southeast is Chesterfield, and to the south is Worthington, all in Hampshire County.

The Westfield River (sometimes referred to as the East Branch) flows through Cummington. Massachusetts Route 9 runs through the town, following the Westfield River for most of its way. Route 9 leads southeast  to Northampton and west  to Pittsfield. Massachusetts Route 112 leads west, then south,  to Huntington.

The mineral cummingtonite was first found in this town and was named after it.

Demographics

As of the census of 2000, there were 978 people, 382 households, and 239 families residing in the town. There were 452 housing units at an average density of 19.6 per square mile (7.6/km2). The racial makeup of the town was 96.42% White, 0.61% African American, 0.41% Native American, 0.31% Asian, 0.51% from other races, and 1.74% from two or more races. Hispanic or Latino of any race were 3.27% of the population.

There were 382 households, out of which 24.3% had children under the age of 18 living with them, 54.2% were married couples living together, 5.8% had a female householder with no husband present, and 37.4% were non-families. 28.0% of all households were made up of individuals, and 10.2% had someone living alone who was 65 years of age or older.  The average household size was 2.26 and the average family size was 2.77.

In the town, the population was spread out, with 27.9% under the age of 18, 5.7% from 18 to 24, 30.3% from 25 to 44, 24.8% from 45 to 64, and 11.2% who were 65 years of age or older.  The median age was 38 years. For every 100 females, there were 102.5 males.  For every 100 females age 18 and over, there were 92.1 males.

The median income for a household in the town was $42,250, and the median income for a family was $48,750. Males had a median income of $31,765 versus $27,279 for females. The per capita income for the town was $21,553.  About 4.2% of families and 6.6% of the population were below the poverty line, including 5.7% of those under age 18 and none of those age 65 or over.

Education
Cummington is part of the Central Berkshire Regional School District, along with Becket,  Dalton, Hinsdale, Peru, Washington, and Windsor. Elementary school students attend Craneville School, middle school students attend Nessacus Regional Middle School, and high school students attend Wahconah Regional High School

Government
The town is part of the First Hampshire District in the Massachusetts House of Representatives, and the Berkshire, Hampden, Franklin, and Hampshire Senate district.

Points of interest
 William Cullen Bryant Homestead
 Greenwood Music Camp

Notable people
 William Cullen Bryant, poet
 Sergei Isupov, artist
 Rachel Maddow, MSNBC host
 Zalmon Richards, educator
 William Jay Smith, poet
 Worcester Reed Warner, engineer
 Alan Weisman, author
 Richard Wilbur, poet

References

External links

 Official Site
 MHC Survey Reconnaissance Town Report: Cummington Massachusetts Historical Commission, 1982.

 
Towns in Hampshire County, Massachusetts
Springfield metropolitan area, Massachusetts
Populated places established in 1762
Towns in Massachusetts